The 2009 Bahrain 2nd GP2 Asia Series round was a GP2 Asia Series motor race held on 25 and 26 April 2009 at Bahrain International Circuit in Sakhir, Bahrain. It was the  final showdown of the 2008–09 GP2 Asia Series. The race supported the 2009 Bahrain Grand Prix.

Classification

Qualifying

 Jérôme d'Ambrosio recorded the fastest time in the time trial, but got a ten-place penalty after receiving a black flag in the previous Malaysian sprint race.

Feature race

Sprint race

Standings after the event 

Drivers' Championship standings

Teams' Championship standings

 Note: Only the top five positions are included for both sets of standings.

See also 
 2009 Bahrain Grand Prix
 2009 Bahrain 2nd Speedcar Series round

References

GP2 Asia Series
GP2 Asia